The  is a  single-track railway line in Hyōgo Prefecture, Japan, operated by the Hankyu Railway. The line connects Shukugawa Station and Kōyōen Station, both in Nishinomiya, Hyōgo.

History
The line opened on 1 October 1924, 1435mm gauge and electrified at 600 VDC, which was increased to 1500 VDC in 1967.

The Great Hanshin earthquake resulted in the line being out of service for six weeks in 1995.

Stations 
All stations are within Nishinomiya, Hyōgo.

References
This article incorporates material from the corresponding article in the Japanese Wikipedia

External links
 Hankyu route information 

Koyo Line
Koyo Line
Rail transport in Hyōgo Prefecture
Standard gauge railways in Japan
Railway lines opened in 1924